Dieppe (Norman: Dgieppe) is a coastal commune in the Seine-Maritime department in the Normandy region of northern France.

Dieppe is a seaport on the English Channel at the mouth of the river Arques. A regular ferry service runs to Newhaven in England.

Famous for its scallops, Dieppe also has a popular pebbled beach, a 15th-century castle and the churches of Saint-Jacques and Saint-Remi. The mouth of the river Scie lies at Hautot-sur-Mer, directly to the west of Dieppe.

The inhabitants of the town of Dieppe are called Dieppois (m) and Dieppoise (f) in French.

History
First recorded as a small fishing settlement in 1030, Dieppe was an important prize fought over during the Hundred Years' War.
Dieppe housed the most advanced French school of cartography in the 16th century. Two of France's best navigators, Michel le Vasseur and his brother Thomas le Vasseur, lived in Dieppe when they were recruited to join the expedition of René Goulaine de Laudonnière which departed Le Havre for Florida on April 20, 1564. The expedition resulted in the construction of Fort Caroline, the first French colony in the New World. Another expedition two years before where Goulaine de Laudonnière was under command of Jean Ribault, a local Huguenot captain, had resulted in the foundation of Charlesfort, now in South Carolina. Dieppe was the premier port of the kingdom in the 17th century.

After King Edward VI died, putting an end to a Protestant country in England on July 6, 1553, John Knox left England to evade the Catholic-fist of Mary I. First, under the permission of his friends, he went back to his home country of Scotland. Then after he stayed in Dieppe for a few months, he continued on his tracks and stayed in Geneva. There he met one of his influences, John Calvin.

On July 23, 1632, 300 colonists heading to New France departed from Dieppe.
At the Revocation of the Edict of Nantes in 1685, Dieppe lost 3,000 of its Huguenot citizens, who fled abroad.

Dieppe was an important target in wartime; the town was largely destroyed by an Anglo-Dutch naval bombardment in 1694. It was rebuilt after 1696 in a typical French classical style by Ventabren, an architect, who gave it its unique feature for a sea port. It was popularised as a seaside resort following the 1824 visit of the widowed Duchess of Berry, daughter-in-law of Charles X. She encouraged the building of the recently renovated municipal theatre, the Petit-Théâtre (1825), associated particularly with Camille Saint-Saëns.

During the later 19th century, Dieppe became popular with English artists as a beach resort. Prominent literary figures such as Arthur Symons loved to keep up with the latest fads of avant-garde France here, and during "the season" sometimes stayed for weeks on end.

Second World War

During the Second World War Dieppe was occupied by German naval and army forces after the fall of France in 1940. In order to allow a better defence of the coast against a possible Allied landing, the Germans destroyed the mauresque casino that was located near the beach area. The destruction of the casino had only begun at the time of the Dieppe Raid.

The raid proved a costly lesson  for the Allies. On August 19, 1942, Allied soldiers, mainly drawn from the 2nd Canadian Infantry Division, landed at Dieppe in the hope of occupying the town for a short time, gaining intelligence and drawing the Luftwaffe into open battle. The Allies suffered more than 1,400 deaths, 907 Canadian, and 1,946 Canadian soldiers were captured – more prisoners than the army lost in the 11 months of the 1944–45 NW Europe campaign. However, no major objectives were achieved. More recent research suggests the raid was a massive cover for an intelligence operation to capture German code machine components.

French soldiers from the region, captured in the fighting of 1940, were returned to the area after the Dieppe Raid as a reward by the German occupation authorities, who felt that the conduct of the French civilians in Dieppe had been correct and had not hindered the defence of the port during the battle.

The port remained garrisoned by German forces until the conclusion of the Battle of Normandy. When the First Canadian Army approached at the end of August, the garrison withdrew, not desiring to enter into battle for the port.

Dieppe was liberated on September 1, 1944, by soldiers from the 2nd Canadian Infantry Division. On September 3, the entire division paused for reorganization, and a victory parade was held; contingents representing all major units of the 2nd Division marched 10 abreast behind the massed pipes and drums of the division's highland regiments. A memorial service was held in the nearby Canadian military cemetery to honour those killed in the Dieppe Raid.

Post-war
Dieppe, a city in New Brunswick, Canada, received its present name in 1946, in honour of the commemoration of the 913 Canadian soldiers killed in the Dieppe Raid. The majority of its inhabitants are of Acadian descent.

Notable people

 Jean Ango (1480–1551), ship owner
 Jean Asselin (v. 1610–1652), painter and drawer

 Jean Cousin (15th century), navigator

 Jean Crasset (1618–1692), writer
 François-Antoine-Henri Descroizilles (1751–1825), chemist

 Adrien de Pauger (?–1726), engineer and architect of the Vieux Carré at New Orleans

 Pierre de Chauvin, sieur de Tonnetuit (1575–1603), Huguenot trader at Honfleur
 Isaac de Caus (1590–1648) architect engineer
 Abraham Duquesne (1610–1688), general lieutenant of the French Navy

 Charles Le Moyne, (1626–1685), colonist of New France, first lord of Longueuil

 Jean Mauger (1648–1712), artist
 Jean Pecquet (1622–1674), physiologist
 Jean Parmentier (1494–1529), navigator and poet
 Jean Ribault (1520–1565), corsaire Protestant
 Richard Simon (1638–1712), historian
 Antoine-Augustin Bruzen de La Martinière (1683–1746), scientist
 Joseph Lavallée (1747–1816), poet, journalist and novelist
 Mary Odette (1901–1987), actress

 Bruno Braquehais (1823–1875), photographer
 Albert Réville (1826–1906), theologist
 Emmanuel Masqueray (1861–1917), architect

 Ernest Henri Dubois (1863–1930), sculptor
 André Alerme (1877–1960), actor

 Louis de Broglie (1892–1987), Nobel Prize–winning physicist
 Jean Rédélé (1922–2007), founder of the Alpine car factory
 Pierre Dupuis (1610–1682), painter
 Yvonne Lephay-Belthoise (1914–2011), classical pianist
 Jean-Paul Villain (born 1946), athlete

 Valérie Lemercier (born 1964), actress
 Olivier Frébourg (born 1965), writer

 Victor Langlois (1829–1869), historian

 Emmanuel "Manu" Petit, (born 1970) a World Cup–winning footballer
 St. Jean de Lalande SJ, a 17th-century Jesuit brother who was martyred by the Iroquois Indians in present-day New York State
 St. Antoine Daniel SJ, martyr and saint

 Thomas Pesquet (born 1978), astronaut, aerospace engineer and pilot

Geography
Dieppe belongs to the Pays de Caux, lying along the Alabaster Coast in the region of Normandy.
It is located on the Channel coast, north of Rouen at the mouth of the river Arques and lies east of the mouth of the river Scie.

Climate

Toponymy
Mentioned as Deppae in 1015–1029, Dieppa in 1030, then in the 12th century: Deppa, Deupa and Diopa.

From Old English dēop or Old Norse djúpr "deep", same meaning. The Nominalization from an Old English or Norse adjective, being unusual, dēop / djúpr could be followed by the Old English word ǣ / ea or Old Norse á "stream, river" (cf. Djúpá, river in Iceland).
 
The same adjective can be recognized in other place-names like Dieppedalle (f. e. Saint-Vaast-Dieppedalle) and Dipdal in Normandy, which is the same as Deepdale in Great Britain.

The stream running through Dieppe was called Tella in Merovingian and Carolingian documents, before being called Dieppe in the 10th century. The name has stuck to the town, although the name of the stream changed again, to Béthune.

Heraldry

Historical images of Dieppe

Population

Sights
The castle, Château de Dieppe, which survived the 1694 bombardment, is now a museum and exhibition space, with a strong maritime collection. A rich collection of 17th- and 18th-century ivory carvings, including lacy folding fans, for which Dieppe was known, and the furnishings and papers of Camille Saint-Saëns. The castle's interior courtyard is picturesque.

At the Square du Canada, near the castle in a park at the western end of the Esplanade, there is a monument erected by the town commemorating the long relationship between Dieppe and Canada. The events recorded begin with the early 16th century, and culminate with the Dieppe Raid and the liberation of Dieppe by Canadians on September 1, 1944. The base of the monument is inscribed with the words "nous nous souvenons" ("we remember"). Above the monument, the Canadian Maple Leaf flag is flown side by side with that of France.

The Notre-Dame-de-Bon-Secours Chapel of Dieppe stands on the coast.

Some of the Canadian soldiers who were killed are buried in the Dieppe Canadian War Cemetery, in the commune of Saint-Aubin-sur-Scie south-west of Dieppe.

Various buildings and sights
 The small municipal theatre, reopened in 2002 : the small municipal theater (1900) has been listed in the supplementary inventory of historic monuments since 1990. It has a Louis XV rockery with gilding style. Its Italian-style theatre, built by the engineer Frissard, was donated by the Duchess of Berry to the municipality in 1826. Rebuilt in 190 and enlarged with a foyer facing the sea, it is contemporary with the Moorish casino and is one of the last vestiges of the time when Dieppe attracted the European aristocracy and upper middle class. Damaged during the Second World War, its facades were covered in cement in the 1960s. The theater was closed in 1961. Canadian in Dieppe. The theater has been a source of political controversy, especially in 2007 when a rehabilitation project was proposed by the municipal majority at the time but fought by the local opposition.
 The casino, inaugurated in 1961 in the presence of Robert Buron, Minister of Public Works, Transport and Tourism, succeeds the Moorish casino and the Art Deco casino of the 1930s. It is mainly located on the site of the former Villa Rachel which was demolished to allow its construction. It has a remarkable architecture.
 L'Estran Cité de la mer, an associative center for scientific and technical culture on the theme of the Upper Normandy coast, presents, over 1,600 m2 of exhibition space, shipbuilding, fishing techniques, the coastal environment and fauna of the English Channel.
 The underground aqueduct, also called the aqueduct of the blue source, is a gravity aqueduct which was drilled in the 16th century by the engineer Toustain under the plateau of Janval. Over 6.7 km, it once brought water from an abundant source located in Petit-Appeville to the city, and is still used in 2022 for the electricity and telecommunications networks.
 The water tower, in the Vertus district at the entrance to the city of Dieppe, was built in 1971 by the architect Herbelin. It has been decorated since 1973 with a polychrome fresco by Victor Vasarely, made up of orange and black diamonds on a blue background.
 A new seaside resort inaugurated on May 15, 2007, contains an outdoor seawater swimming pool, several indoor leisure pools and a thalassotherapy center.
 A Canadian military cemetery is present in Dieppe.

Transport
Dieppe railway station, operated by SNCF, has frequent departures for Rouen-Rive-Droite. SNCF operates also buses to Gisors-Embranchement through Serqueux.

Dieppe has a ferry port with direct services to the English town of Newhaven, situated at the mouth of the River Ouse in East Sussex. The twice-daily service to the Port of Newhaven is operated by DFDS Seaways, under a concession subsidised by the French government. Services are normally operated using the MS Côte D'Albâtre.

Current services 
 DFDS Seaways (Newhaven: two sailings daily)

Former services 
 Hoverspeed (Newhaven: three sailings daily). Withdrawn in 2004.
 P&O Stena Line (Newhaven: three sailings daily). Withdrawn in 1999.

Administration
The current mayor of Dieppe is Nicolas Langlois. Member of the French Communist Party, he was elected in 2017, and re-elected in 2020.

Economy
Historically a major fishing hub, it is still home to a large ferry port and one of the busiest ports in Europe; in the 17th century  the Dieppe Company operated from the port. Until the mid-19th century the Ave Maria lace, a hand-made lace manufacturer was largely based in Dieppe. Currently the town is now home to the Alpine Automobiles global headquarters.

Sport
The town is home to FC Dieppe, one of the oldest football clubs in the country having been founded in 1896.

International relations

Dieppe is twinned with
  Brighton, United Kingdom
  Dieppe, New Brunswick, Canada

See also
 Communes of the Seine-Maritime department
 Dieppe maps

References

Notes

Bibliography

External links

 A tragedy in Dieppe with Oscar Wilde The importance of being Sebastian - in Dieppe - Normandy Then and Now
 Dieppe Town Council website
 Transmanche Ferries, who connect Dieppe and Newhaven (this was previously done by Hoverspeed until 2004).
 Gare Maritime Photographs
 

 
Communes of Seine-Maritime
Port cities and towns on the French Atlantic coast
Ports and harbours of the English Channel
Subprefectures in France